The Chinese Bungalow is a 1930 British drama film directed by Arthur Barnes and J.B. Williams and starring Matheson Lang, Jill Esmond and Anna Neagle. It was based on the 1925 play The Chinese Bungalow. While working on the film J.B. Williams convinced the actress Marjorie Robertson to change her name to Anna Neagle the name under which she would become the most popular British actress in the 1940s.

Main cast
 Matheson Lang as Yuan Sing
 Jill Esmond as Jean
 Anna Neagle as Charlotte
 Ballard Berkeley as Richard Marquess
 Derek Williams as Harold Marquess

References

Bibliography
 Drazin, Charles. The finest years: British cinema of the 1940s. I.B. Tauris & Co, 2007.

External links

1930 films
1930 drama films
British drama films
British black-and-white films
Films shot at British International Pictures Studios
1930s English-language films
1930s British films